Li Yanfeng (born May 15, 1979) is a Chinese discus thrower. Li won China's first discus world title.

Her personal best throw is 67.98 metres, achieved in June 2011 in Schönebeck. The Chinese, and Asian, record is currently held by Xiao Yanling with 71.68 metres.

Achievements

Li originally finished 3rd in the 2012 Summer Olympics, but she moved up a position after Darya Pishchalnikova was disqualified for testing positive for the anabolic steroid oxandrolone.

See also
China at the 2012 Summer Olympics - Athletics

References

1979 births
Living people
Athletes (track and field) at the 2004 Summer Olympics
Athletes (track and field) at the 2008 Summer Olympics
Athletes (track and field) at the 2012 Summer Olympics
Chinese female discus throwers
Olympic athletes of China
People from Suihua
Asian Games medalists in athletics (track and field)
World Athletics Championships medalists
Athletes from Heilongjiang
Athletes (track and field) at the 2010 Asian Games
Medalists at the 2012 Summer Olympics
Olympic silver medalists for China
Olympic silver medalists in athletics (track and field)
Universiade medalists in athletics (track and field)
Asian Games gold medalists for China
Medalists at the 2010 Asian Games
Universiade silver medalists for China
IAAF Continental Cup winners
World Athletics Championships winners
Medalists at the 2001 Summer Universiade
Medalists at the 2003 Summer Universiade
21st-century Chinese women